Jay Uhlman (born February 26, 1974) is a baseball coach and former shortstop, who is the current head baseball coach of the Tulane Green Wave. He played college baseball at Los Angeles Harbor College from 1993 to 1994 before transferring to Nevada where he played in 1995 and 1997. He also served as the head coach of the Los Angeles Harbor Seahawks (2000–2001).

Playing career
Uhlman went to Redondo Union High School in Redondo Beach, California, where he played shortstop. Uhlman was selected in the 48th round of the 1992 Major League Baseball draft by the Toronto Blue Jays. He declined to sign with the Blue Jays, and attended Los Angeles Harbor College. As a Freshman, Uhlman hit .337, being named 2nd Team All-Conference. As a sophomore, he was named First Team All-Conference. The following year, Uhlman transferred to Nevada, where he batted .208 with 2 home runs and 18 RBI. After not playing in 1996, Uhlman returned to the lineup in 1997, hitting .358 with 8 homeruns and 52 RBI. For his efforts, he was named honorable mention All-Big West Conference.

Coaching career
Uhlman began his coaching career as a graduate assistant with the Wolf Pack in 1998, while continuing to work on his degree.

He returned to Los Angeles Harbor College as the head coach for the 2000 season, leading the team to a 25–14–1 record and a third place finish in the conference. The following year, the Seahawks won the South Coast Conference title, going 36–8–1, finishing 5th in the state tournament. Following that successful year, Uhlman was named a full time assistant for the Nevada Wolf Pack, working with hitters and infielders. Following the 2009 season, he took a volunteer position with the recently revived Oregon Ducks baseball program working with hitters and infielders. In 2011, he took a paid position with the Kansas Jayhawks, being named the recruiting coordinator, hitting coach and baserunning/short game coordinator as well as coaching the corner infielders and serve as the third base coach. He returned to Oregon in 2012, where he worked on their staff in various capacities, working as high as Associate Head Coach until 2019.

In the summer of 2019, Uhlman was named the recruiting coordinator at Tulane, joining Travis Jewett's staff. On May 16, 2022, Jewett agreed to part ways with Tulane, and Uhlman was named the interim head coach for the remainder of the 2022 season. He led the Green Wave to a 3–4 record for their final 7 games. On June 7, 2022, Uhlman was promoted to permanent head coach.

Head coaching record

References

External links

Tulane Green Wave bio

1974 births
Living people
Kansas Jayhawks baseball coaches
Los Angeles Harbor Seahawks baseball players
Los Angeles Harbor Seahawks baseball coaches
Nevada Wolf Pack baseball coaches
Nevada Wolf Pack baseball players
Oregon Ducks baseball coaches
Mat-Su Miners players
Sportspeople from Redondo Beach, California
Sportspeople from Cedar Rapids, Iowa
Baseball coaches from Iowa
Baseball coaches from California